East of Eden were a British progressive rock band, who had a Top 10 hit in the UK with the single "Jig-a-Jig" in 1970. The track was stylistically unlike any of their other work. Although some might consider them a symphonic progressive band, others state that their style is mostly jazz-oriented.

History
Their professional career began back in 1967 when they were formed in Bristol as Pictures of Dorian Gray, by Dave Arbus (b. David Arbus, 8 October 1941, Leicester – violin, flute, saxophone, trumpet), Ron Caines (b. Ronald Arthur Caines, 13 December 1939, Bristol – alto saxophone), Geoff Nicholson (b. Geoffrey Nicholson, 27 June 1948, near Bristol – guitar, vocals), Mike Price (bass), and Stuart Rossiter (drums). Price left in spring 1968 and was replaced by Terry Brace (born Terrence Brace, 28 September 1943, Bristol). Vocalist and guitarist Al Read (b. Alan G Read, 26 March 1942, Chelsea, London) joined at the same time.

With this line-up the band released the now very-rare single, "King Of Siam", on 25 July 1968. They appeared in the film Laughter in the Dark.

Brace and Read left in September 1968; the band carried on with Nicholson as their main vocalist, with Ron Caines occasionally contributing. was replaced by Steve York (b. 24 April 1948, London). Rossiter also left, and was replaced in September 1968 by Dave Dufort (b. David Dufort, 1947, London). In 1968 they moved to London, and were signed to a recording contract with Deram Records. In February 1969 Dufort left and in came Bryan Appleyard, who was replaced in June 1969 by Geoff Britton (b. Geoffrey Britton, 1 August 1943, Lewisham, South East London) (drums), who later joined Wings. York also left in June 1969, and in came bassist Andy Sneddon (born Andrew Sneddon, 8 May 1946, Kilbirnie, Ayrshire, Scotland).

In 1969 they released the Mercator Projected album, featuring the line-up of Dave Arbus, Ron Caines, Geoff Nicholson, Steve York and Dave Dufort (Dufort's surname was misspelled "Dufont" on the cover of the original LP release, and also on the CD re-release in 2008, which featured as part of its artwork a photo of the back cover of the original LP, complete with the misspelling).  This album was followed by Snafu (1970), and Jig-a-Jig, a European-only compilation, released in 1971. Snafu reached the Top 30 of the UK Albums Chart, while a single, "Ramadhan", reached number two in France. Caines and Nicholson left the band in the 1970s for an unsuccessful stint with Harvest Records. Arbus also left around this time, and was replaced by Joe O'Donnell (b. Joseph O'Donnell, 26 December 1948, Limerick, County Limerick, Republic of Ireland). The band continued to record and tour in Europe.

Original guitarist Nicholson left in May 1970. The band broke up in 1978 having undergone various changes in membership. Important members in late line-ups included vocalist Al Read; bassist Terence 'Terry' Brace; bassist Andy Sneddon; bassist/vocalist David 'Davy' Jack (b. 24 January 1940, Glasgow, Strathclyde, Scotland); drummer Jeff Allen (b. Jeffrey Allen, 23 April 1946, Matlock, Derbyshire – from June 1970); bassist/vocalist Martin Fisher (b. 1947, Kingston-upon-Thames, Surrey); violinist Joe O'Donnell (from March 1973); Alan 'Al' Perkes (b. 26 May 1949, Bow, east London); and guitarist Garth Watt-Roy (b. Garth Philip Watt-Roy, December 1947, Bombay, India – from February 1972).

The three core members (Arbus, Caines and Nicholson) reunited in 1996, and their album Kalipse was released the following year. Like most of their earlier work, it was a cult hit.

Arbus was a guest musician on The Who's track "Baba O'Riley", playing the violin solo. He was a friend of Who drummer, Keith Moon, and, later, became a member of Fiddler's Dram.

Personnel

Timeline

Albums
 Mercator Projected (April 1969, Deram)
 Snafu (February 1970, Deram)
 Jig-A-Jig (1971, Deram, European-only compilation)
 East Of Eden (June 1971, Harvest)
 New Leaf (November 1971, Harvest)
 Another Eden (1975, Harvest, European-only release)
 Here We Go Again (1976, EMI, European-only release)
 It's The Climate (1977, EMI, European-only release)
 Silver Park (1978, EMI, European-only release)
 Kalipse (1997, Transatlantic)
 Armadillo (2001, Blueprint) (Voiceprint)
 Graffito (2005, Eclectic)

See also 
 Plastic Dog Agency

References

External links
 
 
 

English progressive rock groups
Jazz fusion ensembles
Musical groups established in 1967
Deram Records artists
Harvest Records artists
1967 establishments in England
Musical_groups_from_Bristol